Madallah Al-Olayan (born 25 August 1994) is a Saudi professional footballer who currently plays as a right back for Saudi club Al-Ittihad.

Playing career
Alolayan made his professional debut during a 2-1 loss against Al-Faisaly on 6 December 2012, replacing Basem Al-Sharif after 78 minutes. His first experience as a part of the starting XI came three months later, when he played 90 minutes against Al-Ittihad FC in March. His playing time increased during the 2013–14 season, where he made 23 combined league and cup appearances. Al-Taawoun finished 5th.

His role decreased again the following season, where he made only seven appearances, and Al-Taawoun finished 9th.

On 22 January 2022, Al-Olayan joined Al-Ittihad in a swap deal that saw Saud Abdulhamid join Al-Hilal.

Career statistics

Club

Honours

Al-Taawoun
 Kings Cup: 2019

Al-Hilal
 Saudi Professional League: 2019–20, 2020–21
 Kings Cup: 2019–20
 AFC Champions League: 2021
 Saudi Super Cup: 2021

Al-Ittihad
Saudi Super Cup: 2022

References

External links
 
 
 Goal profile
 

1994 births
Living people
Saudi Arabian footballers
Saudi Arabia international footballers
Al-Taawoun FC players
Al Hilal SFC players
Ittihad FC players
Saudi Professional League players
Association football fullbacks
Sportspeople from Mecca